Presidential elections were held in Sri Lanka on 26 January 2010. The elections were announced on 23 November 2009 when incumbent President Mahinda Rajapaksa decided to seek a fresh mandate prior to the expiration of his term in 2011. Nominations were accepted on 17 December 2009.

Rajapaksa, who was elected president for a 6-year term in November 2005, was the candidate of the ruling United People's Freedom Alliance. General Sarath Fonseka, a former commander of the Sri Lankan Army, was his main opponent in the election. Fonseka had been endorsed by a number of main opposition parties, including the United National Party and the Janatha Vimukthi Peramuna.

President Rajapaksa proceeded to win re-election, over 57% of all votes cast. Fonseka received over 40%, carrying the Northern and Eastern Provinces of Sri Lanka. The remaining twenty candidates all garnered less than 0.5% of the popular vote.

Background
In 2005, Mahinda Rajapaksa was elected to his first term as president, defeating former prime minister Ranil Wickramasinghe, the United National Party (UNP) candidate. Before the election, Mahinda Rajapaksa was Prime Minister under President Chandrika Kumaratunga. Rajapaksa won a narrow victory, by 190,000 votes, or 50.29% of the popular vote. The separatist Tamil Tigers had called for a boycott of the election in the Northern and Eastern provinces, resulting in a minimal turnout, which the opposition claimed resulted in their defeat.

The Constitution of Sri Lanka allows the president to ask for a fresh election after four years into his first term of office (per the Constitution, a President is elected to a six-year term). Accordingly, President Rajapaksa informed the Commissioner of Elections on 23 November 2009 of his intention to hold a presidential election before the end of his current term of office.

Preparations
Dayananda Dissanayake, the Commissioner of Elections, announced on 27 November 2009 that the presidential election would be held on 26 January 2010. Nominations for the election were accepted on 17 December 2009. Sri Lankans registered with the Department of Elections and eligible to vote totalled 14,088,500, up from 13,327,160 in the November 2005 presidential elections. Over 11,000 polling booths were set up across the country for receiving ballots.

Candidates

Mahinda Rajapaksa
President Rajapaksa decided to end his six-year term almost two years early, that he might seek a fresh mandate and a longer term based on contemporary political successes that greatly increased his popularity. These included the military defeat of the Liberation Tigers of Tamil Eelam, as well as the end of the 26-year Sri Lankan Civil War in May 2009. These were accomplishments the previous three presidents of Sri Lanka had tried and failed to secure. Having succeeded where they had failed, Rajapaksa's United People's Freedom Alliance achieved unprecedented victories in the provincial council elections that followed the end of the war.

Sarath Fonseka
General Sarath Fonseka is considered a national hero for bringing an end to the Sri Lankan Civil War while serving as commander of the Sri Lankan Army from 2005 to 2009. However, following the military victory, tensions grew between President Rajapaksa and Fonseka, who later accused Rajapaksa of sidelining him after the end of the conflict. Opposition parties expected early elections and approached Fonseka, asking him to run as a "common candidate" for the opposition against Rajapaksa. After weeks of rumours, Fonseka eventually retired from the military in November 2009 and announced his candidacy two weeks later. He ran as the New Democratic Front's candidate, using the swan symbol.

Minor candidates
Apart from Rajapaksa and Fonseka, twenty other candidates had their nominations accepted, and appeared on ballot papers.

One nomination—J.A. Peter Nelson Perera of the Sri Lanka Progressive Front—was rejected on technical grounds. Five independent candidates ran as minor contenders. This made for the greatest number of candidates in a presidential election in Sri Lankan history, breaking the record of 13 in the 2005 presidential election.

Violence and violations of election laws
 
Sri Lankan elections have a history of violence, misuse of state resources, and other violations of election laws. Sri Lankan police received nearly 975 election-related complaints, and 375 arrests were made relative thereto. The Centre for Monitoring Election Violence (CMEV) had recorded 809 incidents from 23 November 2009, when the elections were officially announced, to 25 January 2010. People’s Action for Free and Fair Elections (PAFFREL) has recorded 666 incidents between 17 December 2009 and 25 January 2010. The UN, United States, and EU expressed concern over the level of violence. Election monitoring groups stated that this election was the most violent in more than 20 years. Although supporters of both main candidates were blamed for the incidents, the responsibility for most was pinned on Rajapaksa's supporters. However, government politician Wimal Weerawansa accused the opposition of orchestrating violence against their own supporters and meetings in order to blame Rajapaksa's backers. According to the National Polls Observation Center, criminal gangs and deserters from the army were employed to incite violence.

The government promised tight security on the day of the election, deploying over 68,000 policemen to keep the polls safe, with the Sri Lankan Military providing additional support. The election monitoring group Centre for Free and Fair Elections deployed 6,500 monitors on election day, with the PAFFREL deploying a further 6,000, including 14 foreign monitors. The government denied rumours of possible post-election violence, with Foreign Minister Rohitha Bogollagama saying, "I don't think the people of Sri Lanka have time for street protests. It has never happened."

Election day was largely peaceful, with a few minor incidents reported. According to Inspector General of Police Mahinda Balasuriya, no major incidents occurred during the election. A number of explosions, however, were heard in Jaffna and Vavuniya in the north of the country during the day.

Violence
There were hundreds of violent incidents during the run-up to the election. Officially, there have been four murders related to the election:
12 January 2010– Kusumawathie Kuruppuarachchi, a 58-year-old mother was shot dead when gunmen on motorbikes opened fire on a bus carrying Fonseka supporters in Hungama, Hambantota District.
16 January 2010– Saman Kumara, a Rajapaksa supporter, was shot dead in a clash between supporters of the two main candidates in Madurankuliya, Puttalam District.
18 January 2010– Dhammika Herath, a 33-year-old businessman, was beaten to death whilst pasting posters supporting Fonseka in Wariyapola, Kurunegala District.
18 January 2010– D.M. Suranga Indrajith, a 27-year-old driver for government minister Jayarathna Herath, was killed in a grenade attack in Vanduragala, Kurunegala District.

The CMEV has linked a fifth death to the elections:
19 January 2010– Lingeswaran, a Fonseka supporter, was found dead on the Kandy-Matale railway line in Warapitiya, Matale District.

Misuse of state resources
There were accusations of widespread misuse of state property during the election campaign. State-owned institutions paid for numerous advertisements supporting Rajapaksa, while public officials, state owned buildings and vehicles were allegedly used for Rajapaksa's campaign. State-owned television stations gave extensive coverage to Rajapaksa's campaign, with little mention of other candidates. Elections Commissioner Dissanayake criticised the government for not preventing the misuse of state resources.

Voting
Postal voting for the presidential election took place on 12 and 13 January 2010. A grace period was granted until noon on 26 January for postal voters.  Applications for this form of absentee voting totalled 458,154, with 401,118 applications accepted by the Elections Department. More than 80% of postal voters cast their votes on 12 and 13 January, this period ending with "no major incidents" according to the National Polls Observation Centre and the People's Action for Free and Fair Election (PAFFREL).

Voting for the presidential election began at 7:00 am on 26 January 2010. A total of 11,098 election centres and 888 counting centres were set up throughout the country. The Elections Commissioner had requested that voters cast their ballots early in the day.

Rajapaksa voted, in the morning at Medamulana, as did opposition leader Ranil Wickramasinghe, in Colombo. Candidate Fonseka did not vote, claiming that he had not been allowed to do so despite his eligibility. The government later challenged this, stating that if he were not qualified to vote, he would "not (be) entitled to become elected". It announced that legal action would be sought against his candidacy, although the election commissioner had ruled that he was eligible to run in the election. By the time voting ended at 4.00 pm, over 70% of eligible voters had turned out, though in the Northern and Eastern provinces, figures were less than 20%. Sri Lanka's stock market recorded an all-time high on election day; the Colombo Stock Exchange jumped 1.58%, putting it up 131% since the end of the war.

Results
Final turnout was 74.5%, with 10,495,451 voting out of the 14,088,500 voters registered. Of these, 10,393,613 were ruled valid votes, with 101,838 rejected. According to the end result, Rajapaksa was elected to a second term of office with 6,015,934 votes, or 57.88% of the vote. Fonseka finished second with 4,173,185 votes, or 40.15%. Fonseka announced that he did not accept the results, and that legal action would be taken. Supporters of Rajapaksa took to the streets on the announcement of the result, waving national flags and lighting firecrackers. Rajapaksa called his victory "a choice of the people" and that he was then President of everyone in the country.

District results
Official district-by-district results of the election are listed below.

Maps

Fraud concerns
Election observers and advocacy groups have questioned the fundamental fairness of the campaign, accusing Mr. Rajapaksa of using state resources to finance his run. State-owned news media all but shut out opposition candidates. Election commissioner Dayananda Dissanayake said the state media violated his guidelines, government institutions misbehaved, and he asked for approval to resign: "I request to be released," he said, just after he announced the results.

Post-election events
On the morning of 27 January, the Sri Lankan military surrounded a hotel where Fonseka and a number of opposition politicians had convened. The military claimed that 400 armed army deserters had gathered there, and demanded their surrender. Fonseka accused the military of preparing to arrest him if he won the elections. However, according to a military spokesman, they were there merely as a preventive measure, as the purpose of the gathering was uncertain. The military later arrested 10 men, who the opposition claimed were members of Fonseka's security contingent and not army deserters.

Plot to assassinate Rajapaska and government officers

At a press briefing held on Thursday, 28 January, the Director of the Media Centre for National Security, Lakshman Hulugalle, told reporters that Gen. Fonseka moved into the hotel with over 70 retired army officers and deserters to plot the assassination of victorious President Mahinda Rajapaksa and his family. The Sri Lanka Ministry of Defence reported that they were still looking for evidence to prove Mr. Fonseka's involvement.

International reaction
 – President Pratibha Patil and Prime Minister Manmohan Singh on Wednesday congratulated Sri Lankan President Mahinda Rajapaksa on his re-election and expressed confidence that the country would find lasting peace in which all communities would live with dignity and harmony. President Patil said, "I am confident that under your continued leadership, Sri Lanka will attain greater heights and find lasting peace." Prime Minister Singh said Rajapaksa's electoral success "is a reflection of the trust" the people of Sri Lanka had placed in him.
 Palestinian Popular Struggle Front – The Front sent a letter in support of President Rajapaksa. "On behalf of the Palestinians in and out of Palestine, (we) express (our) grateful thanks to President Mahinda Rajapasksa, who has been fighting for the Palestinians during the last 40 years."
 – UN chief Ban Ki-moon on Wednesday voiced relief that Sri Lanka's presidential polls went off relatively peacefully, and urged the country's political parties to abide by the official results. Secretary-General Ban stated, "I had been concerned at the level of violence during the campaign. I am relieved that the vote yesterday appears to have been relatively peaceful, despite some violent incidents."
 United States Department of State – The United States Embassy in Colombo release a statement which read, "The United States congratulates Sri Lanka for the first nationwide election in decades and President Rajapaksa on his victory. We look forward to continuing the partnership between our two countries and working with the Government and the people to support a peaceful and prosperous Sri Lanka." State Department spokesman Philip Crowley told reporters, "I think it is remarkable when you consider what Sri Lanka has come through recently. There is a process for resolving electoral disputes. We're obviously aware that there have been claims of victory and counterclaims" and ruled out further comment at that time.
 – Russian President Dmitry Medvedev in his congratulation message says that the policy been conducted by the president aimed at economic development and strengthening of stability will continue to settle social and political issues in the country.
 – The Government of Japan has congratulated President Mahinda Rajapaksa on his victory at the recently concluded presidential election. Katsuya Okada, Japanese Foreign Minister, issuing a communique, states that the Japanese government hopes the resettlement of displaced persons will be expedited in a country that has shown steady progress.
 – Nepali Congress (NC) President Girija Prasad Koirala has congratulated incumbent Sri Lankan President Mahinda Rajapaksa for his victory in the presidential election of Sri Lanka for the second time. He further went on to say "Your victory to the post of President is the result of your vital role to the establishment of peace, ending longtime armed conflict in Sri Lanka". He expressed his confidence that the peace and human rights would be institutionalised during Rajapaksa's term of office.
 – Vietnam's Foreign Ministry spokeswoman Nguyen Phuong Nga congratulated Mahinda Rajapaksa's re-election as president. "We hope the Sri Lankan people, under the clear-sighted leadership of Mahinda Rajapaksa, will attain still greater achievements in national reconstruction and development," she said.
 – Welcoming the peaceful conduct of Presidential polls in Sri Lanka, the European Union today promised all out support for bringing political reconciliation in the country ravaged by decades of ethnic conflict. Congratulating President Mahinda Rajapaksa for winning the 26 January polls, it "welcomed that the Presidential Elections in Sri Lanka, the first election of this kind for many years, took place in an overall peaceful environment.
 – Minister of the Environment and International Development Erik Solheim has congratulated President Mahinda Rajapakse on his re-election on 26 January. In his message Solheim stated that "I would like to congratulate President Rajapakse. Norway and Sri Lanka enjoy close and longstanding bilateral relations. We intend to continue our cooperation with the Government and people of Sri Lanka with a view to promoting lasting peace and development, We note that the election itself was relatively peaceful. However, we are concerned by reports of unrest and violent incidents during the lead-up to the election, as well as of possible violations of the election law. We urge that these allegations be investigated in accordance with Sri Lankan law and the country’s democratic traditions."

Notes

References

External links

Official websites
 Office of the President of Sri Lanka 
 Department of Elections 
Election monitors
 Centre for Monitoring Election Violence
 Island Election Center
Media
 Twenty-two candidates for Lanka presidential election – Radio France Internationale in English
Election manifestos
 "Mahinda's Vision II - Brighter Future" - Election manifesto of Mahinda Rajapaksa (English)
 "Mahinda Chinthana II - Suba Anagathayak" - Election manifesto of Mahinda Rajapaksa (Sinhala)
 "Vishvasaneeya Venasak" - Election manifesto of Sarath Fonseka (Sinhala) 
 "Vishvasaneeya Venasak" - Election manifesto of Sarath Fonseka (English)

 
Presidential elections in Sri Lanka
Sri Lanka
Sri Lanka